Cruise control (also known as speed control, cruise command, autocruise, or tempomat) is a system that automatically controls the speed of a motor vehicle. The system is a servomechanism that takes over the throttle of the car to maintain a steady speed as set by the driver.

History

Speed control existed in early automobiles such as the Wilson-Pilcher in the early 1900s. They had a lever on the steering column that could be used to set the speed to be maintained by the engine. In 1908, the Peerless included a governor to maintain the speed of the engine through an extra throttle lever on the steering wheel. Peerless successfully used a flyball governor. They advertised their system as being able to "maintain speed whether uphill or down". 

A governor was used by James Watt and Matthew Boulton in 1788 to control steam engines, but the use of governors dates at least back to the 17th century. On an engine, the governor uses centrifugal force to adjust throttle position to adapt the speed of the engine to different loads (e.g. when going up a hill).

Modern cruise control (also known as a speedostat or tempomat) was invented in 1948 by the blind inventor and mechanical engineer Ralph Teetor. He came up with the idea due to being frustrated by his driver's habit of speeding up and slowing down as he talked. 

A more significant factor in the developing of cruise control was the  speed limit imposed in the US during World War II to reduce gasoline use and tire wear. A mechanism controlled by the driver provided resistance to further pressure on the accelerator pedal when the vehicle reached the desired speed. Teetor's idea of a dashboard speed selector with a mechanism connected to the driveshaft and a device able to push against the gas pedal was patented in 1950. He added a speed lock capability that maintained the car's speed until the driver tapped the brake pedal or turned off the system.

A 1955 U.S. patent for a "constant speed regulator" was filed in 1950 by M-Sgt Frank J. Riley. He conceived the device while driving on the Pennsylvania Turnpike and installed his invention in his car in 1948. 

Another inventor named Harold Exline, working independently of Riley, also invented a type of cruise control that he first installed on his own car and the cars of friends. Exline filed a U.S. patent for a "vacuum powered throttle control with electrically controlled air valve" in 1951, and the patent was granted in 1956. Despite these patents, Riley, Exline, and subsequent patent holders were not able to collect royalties for any cruise control inventions.

The first car with Teetor's "speedostat" system was the 1958 Chrysler Imperial (called "auto-pilot") using a speed control dial on the dashboard. This system calculated ground speed from the rotating speedometer-cable and used a bi-directional screw-drive electric motor to vary the throttle position as needed. Cadillac soon renamed and marketed the device as "cruise control." 

In 1965, American Motors Corporation (AMC) introduced a low-priced automatic speed control for its large-sized cars with automatic transmissions. The AMC "cruise command" unit was started through a push-button once the desired speed was reached, and then the throttle position was automatically adjusted by vacuum control directly from the speedometer cable, rather than through an adjustable control on the dashboard.

Daniel Aaron Wisner invented an "automotive electronic cruise control" in 1968 as an engineer for RCA's Industrial and Automation Systems Division in Plymouth, Michigan. His invention is described in two patents filed that year (US patents 3570622 and 3511329), with the second introducing digital memory, and was the first electronic device that controlled a car.

Due to the 1973 oil crisis and rising fuel prices, the device became more popular in the U.S. "Cruise control can save gas by avoiding surges that expel fuel" while driving at steady speeds. In 1974, AMC, GM, and Chrysler priced the option at $60 to $70, while Ford charged $103.

In the late 1980s, an integrated circuit for Wisner's design for an electronic cruise control was finally commercially developed by Motorola as the MC14460 Automotive Speed Control Processor in CMOS. The advantage of electronic speed control over its mechanical predecessor was that it could be integrated with electronic accident avoidance and engine management systems.

Operation

The driver must bring the vehicle up to speed manually and use a button to set the cruise control to the current speed.

The cruise control takes its speed signal from a rotating driveshaft, speedometer cable, wheel speed sensor from the engine's RPM, or from internal speed pulses produced electronically by the vehicle. The vehicle will maintain the desired speed by pulling the throttle cable with a solenoid, a vacuum-driven servomechanism, or by using the electronic systems built into the vehicle (fully electronic) if it uses a 'drive-by-wire' system.

All cruise control systems must be capable of being turned off both explicitly and automatically when the driver depresses the brake, and often also the clutch. Cruise control often includes a memory feature to resume the set speed after braking, and a coast feature to reduce the set speed without braking. When the cruise control is engaged, the throttle can still be used to accelerate the car, but once the pedal is released the car will then slow down until it reaches the previously set speed.

On the latest vehicles fitted with electronic throttle control, cruise control can be integrated into the vehicle's engine management system. Modern "adaptive" systems include the ability to automatically reduce speed when the distance to a car in front, or the speed limit, decreases.

The cruise control systems of some vehicles incorporate a "speed limiter" function, which will not allow the vehicle to accelerate beyond a pre-set maximum; this can usually be overridden by fully depressing the accelerator pedal. (Most systems will prevent the vehicle from increasing engine speed to accelerate beyond the chosen speed, but will not apply the brakes in the event of overspeeding downhill, nor stop the car from going faster than the chosen speed with the engine just idling.)

On vehicles with a manual transmission, cruise control is less flexible because the act of depressing the clutch pedal and shifting gears usually disengages the cruise control. The "resume" feature has to be used each time after selecting the new gear and releasing the clutch. Therefore, cruise control is of most benefit at motorway/highway speeds when top gear is used virtually all the time. The speed limiter function however does not have this problem.

Advantages and disadvantages
Some advantages of cruise control include:
 It is useful for long drives (reducing driver fatigue, improving comfort by allowing positioning changes more safely) across highways and sparsely populated roads.
 Some drivers use it to avoid violating speed limits. A driver who otherwise tends to unconsciously increase speed over the course of a highway journey may avoid speeding.
 Increased fuel efficiency

However, when used incorrectly cruise control can lead to accidents due to several factors, such as:
 hazardous weather conditions. Many states warn against the use of cruise control if the road has ice or snow. When a car skids with cruise control enabled, the vehicle will keep accelerating, increasing the chance of losing control. If the vehicle is sliding on ice, the driver should not brake or accelerate, and just let the vehicle slow down on its own.
 speeding around curves that require slowing down
 rough or loose terrain that could negatively affect the cruise control controls
 Encourages drivers to pay less attention to driving, increasing the risk of an accident
 Risk of SUA (Sudden Unintended Acceleration) and possible accidents. Driver having feet at rest loses spatial perception and, in case of a traffic emergency, hits the accelerator instead of the brakes.

Adaptive cruise control

Some modern vehicles have systems for adaptive cruise control (ACC), which is a general term meaning improved cruise control. These improvements can be automatic braking or dynamic set-speed type controls.

Automatic braking type: the automatic braking type use either a single or a combination of sensors (radar, lidar, and camera) to allow the vehicle to keep pace with the car it is following, slow when closing in on the vehicle in front, and accelerating again to the preset speed when traffic allows. Some systems also feature forward collision warning systems, which warn the driver if a vehicle in front—given the speed of both vehicles—gets too close (within the preset headway or braking distance).  

Dynamic set speed type: The dynamic set speed uses the GPS position of speed limit signs, from a database. Some are modifiable by the driver.

Non-braking type: The speed can be adjusted to allow traffic calming.

Dynamic radar cruise control: uses a camera and millimeter-wave radar to maintain a setpoint distance from vehicles in front of the car; the system will automatically slow down or speed up based on the vehicles in front.  The system cannot detect completely stationary vehicles or pedestrians unless equipped with a camera system, so the driver must always pay attention.  Vehicles with adaptive cruise control are considered a Level 1 autonomous car, as defined by SAE International.

See also
 PID controller - Fundamental control concept used in car cruise control

References

External links

 
 
Cruise control block diagram
 Overview of intelligent vehicle safety systems
 Intelligent Transport Systems
 Preventive safety applications and technologies
 Cruise [Un]Control: Driver sets the cruise control on his vehicle, then slips into the backseat for a nap at Snopes.com

Automotive accessories
Automotive technologies